Rainbow Creek may refer to:

 Independent State of Rainbow Creek, an Australian micronation of the 1970s and 1980s
 Rainbow Creek (Ohio)
 Rainbow Creek (Washington), source for Rainbow Falls (Chelan County)